The 1920 Fermanagh County Council election was held on Thursday, 3 June 1920.

Council results

Division results

Kesh

Lisnaskea

Newtownbutler

Crum

Enniskillen

References

1920 Irish local elections
Elections in County Fermanagh